Blue Is the Warmest Colour is a 2013 French romantic coming-of-age drama film directed by Abdellatif Kechiche, and produced by Kechiche, Brahim Chioua, and Vincent Maraval. The screenplay also co-written by Kechiche was based on Jul Maroh's 2010 graphic novel of the same name. Adèle Exarchopoulos stars as a teenager who falls in love with an older woman played by Léa Seydoux.

The film premiered at the 66th Cannes Film Festival on 23 May 2013 where it won the Palme d'Or. For the first time, the jury at Cannes presented the award to three recipients: Kechiche, Exarchopoulos, and Seydoux. At the age of 19, Exarchopoulos became the youngest recipient of the award. The film grossed over €14 million at the worldwide box office on a production budget of €4 million. Rotten Tomatoes, a review aggregator, surveyed 197 reviews and judged 89% to be positive.

Blue Is the Warmest Colour garnered awards and nominations in a variety of categories with particular praise for Kechiche's direction, and the performances of Exarchopoulos and Seydoux. At the 39th César Awards, the film received eight nominations including Best Film, Best Director for Kechiche, and Best Actress for Seydoux. Exarchopoulous was the sole winner for Most Promising Actress. She also won the Critics' Choice Movie Award for Best Young Performer, Lumières Award for Most Promising Actress, and Best Breakthrough Actress from the National Board of Review. Seydoux garnered the Lumières Award for Best Actress as well as a nomination for the BAFTA Rising Star Award. The film also received an Independent Spirit Award, Bodil Award, Robert Award, and Guldbagge Award.

Accolades

Notes

See also
2013 in film

References

External links
 

Lists of accolades by film